Stay Hard is the fourth full-length album by the British heavy metal band Raven, released in 1985. It is the first album recorded in the United States for the major label Atlantic Records, after the British band had passed under American management, and it was with this album that the band's more glam metal commercial sound was established.

"Hard Ride" is a re-recording of the song from Raven's debut album Rock Until You Drop.

Track listing

Personnel

Raven 
John Gallagher – bass, vocals
Mark Gallagher – guitar
Rob Hunter – drums

Production 
Michael Wagener – producer on tracks 3 and 8, mixing
Norman Dunn – engineer
Alex Perialas, Peter Bombar – assistant engineers
George Marino – mastering at Sterling Sound, New York
Jon Zazula, Marsha Zazula, Tony Incigeri – executive producers
Bob Defrin – art direction

Charts
Album - Billboard (North America)

References

1985 albums
Raven (British band) albums
Albums produced by Michael Wagener
Atlantic Records albums